Bethmaus, or Beth Maʿon, also called Maon, was a Jewish village during the late Second Temple and Mishnaic periods, and which was already a ruin (Tell Maʿūn) when Kitchener visited the site in 1877. It is now incorporated within the modern city bounds of Upper Tiberias.

The Midrash (Genesis Rabba § 85:7) says of the village, "Beth Maʿon, they ascend to it from Tiberias, but they go down to it from Kefar Shobtai." The Jerusalem Talmud, citing a variant account, says that they would go down to Beth Maʿon from its broad place.

History
Based on the potsherds found in situ, the place was inhabited as early as the Bronze Age and Iron Age. 

Josephus, the Jewish general turned historian, mentions that when he was put in charge of the public affairs of Galilee by the people of Jerusalem during the war with Rome, he moved with two of his fellow-legates who were priests of Aaron's lineage from Sepphoris to the village Bethmaus (henceforth: Beth Maʿon), a village situated four furlongs (stadia) distant from Tiberias. It was at Beth Maʿon that Josephus met Justus of Tiberias. There, they convened a meeting with the principal persons of Tiberias, to discuss a plan to demolish a house built by Herod the Tetrarch in Tiberias, and which had the figures of living creatures in it (contrary to Jewish law), but to restore the royal furniture of that house, consisting of candlesticks made of Corinthian brass, and of royal tables, and of a great quantity of uncoined silver, to the king. However, when Josephus took leave of Beth Maʿon and went into Upper Galilee, before Josephus and the senate of Tiberias could carry out their schemes, certain mariners and poor people of Galilee had plundered the house built by Herod of its effects, and taken away the spoils.

In the early 2nd-century CE, following the Bar Kokhba revolt, Beth Maʿon became the residence of one of the priestly clans known as Ḥuppah. Around this time, representatives of the twenty-four priestly wards moved and settled in the Galilee. In the 20th-century, three stone inscriptions were discovered bearing the names of the priestly wards, their order and the name of the locality to which they had moved after the destruction of the Second Temple: In 1920, a stone inscription was found in Ashkelon showing a partial list of the priestly wards; in 1962 three small fragments of one Hebrew stone inscription bearing the partial names of places associated with the priestly courses (the rest of which had been reconstructed) were found in Caesarea Maritima, dated to the third-fourth centuries; in 1970 a stone inscription was found on a partially buried column in a mosque, in the Yemeni village of Bayt al-Ḥaḍir, showing ten names of the priestly wards and their respective towns and villages. The Yemeni inscription is the longest roster of names of this sort ever discovered unto this day, and mentions the priestly course in Beth Maʿon. The seventh-century poet, Eleazar ben Killir, echoing the same tradition, also wrote a liturgical poem detailing the 24-priestly wards and their places of residence. 

In the 3rd-century CE, Rabbi Yohanan officiated in the synagogue of Maon and was called to render a decision in the case of a ritual slaughterer (shochet) who had improperly slaughtered a chicken and whether or not he was to be held liable on that account.

In extant Turkish documents dating to May 1566, the Ottoman ruler, Sultan Suleiman the Magnificent, ordered that water be drawn from Beth Maʿon and brought to Tiberias, the purpose of which is not now known, although thought to have been for agricultural crops. By April 1566, when the work had not yet been completed and the workers (under Don Joseph Nasi) demanded more money from the Sultan to complete the project, the Sultan refused to set aside more money for the project. Below Beth Maʿon, between the ruins of the ancient village and Tiberias, are found two natural springs.

References

Bibliography

External links
 Survey of Western Palestine, Map 6: IAA, Wikimedia commons

Geography of Israel
Ancient Jewish settlements of Galilee
Galilee
Geography of Palestine (region)
Talmud places